Montenegrin–Slovenian relations are foreign relations between the Montenegro and Slovenia.  Until 1991, both countries were part of Yugoslavia. Slovenia recognized Montenegro's independence on June 20, 2006.  Both countries established diplomatic relations on June 21, 2006.  Montenegro has an embassy in Ljubljana. On June 23, 2006, Slovenia opened its embassy in Podgorica.  Both countries are members of the Union for the Mediterranean.
Both countries are members of NATO. Also Montenegro is an EU candidate and Slovenia is an EU member.

See also 
 Foreign relations of Montenegro
 Foreign relations of Slovenia
 Accession of Montenegro to the European Union

External links 
  Slovenian Ministry of Foreign Affairs: directions of contacts with Montenegro

 
Slovenia
Bilateral relations of Slovenia